Sir William Duncan Paterson Stewart  (born 6 June 1935) was President of the Royal Society of Edinburgh from 1999–2002 and Chairman of the Microbiological Research Authority.

Education
Stewart was educated at Bowmore Junior Secondary School, Dunoon Grammar School and the University of Glasgow, where he gained Bachelor of Science, Doctor of Philosophy and Doctor of Science degrees.

Career

From 1990 to 1995 Stewart was Chief Scientific Adviser, Cabinet Office, and the first Head of the UK Office of Science and Technology (1992–1995).

Stewart is also Chairman of the National Radiological Protection Board (NRPB) and  Chairman of the Health Protection Agency. He has held a number of other high-profile appointments including: Architect of the Government's Technology Foresight Programme, which was launched in 1995 and Chairman of the Independent Expert Group on Mobile Telephones and Health, which reported in 2000.  He is a biologist by training. He was Chairman of Tayside University Hospitals NHS Trust but resigned following a critical report from the Tayside Task Force. He has served on numerous advisory committees, including the Royal Commission on Environmental Pollution and the Natural Environment Research Council. Stewart was Chief Executive of the Agricultural and Food Research Council, a former Vice-President of the Royal Society of London and is a Past President of the British Association for the Advancement of Science.

Personal
Stewart is married to the former Elizabeth Smales, a senior medical officer at the Scottish Executive.

References

1935 births
Living people
Scottish biologists
Knights Bachelor
Chief Scientific Advisers to HM Government
Fellows of the Royal Society
Fellows of the Royal Society of Edinburgh
People from Islay
Presidents of the British Science Association
Academics of the University of Nottingham
Academics of the University of London
Academics of the University of Dundee